Vivien Kirk is a New Zealand mathematician who studies dynamical systems. She is a professor of mathematics at the University of Auckland, where she also serves as associate dean, and was president of the New Zealand Mathematical Society for 2017–2019.

Education and career
After earning bachelor's and master's degrees at the University of Auckland, Kirk went to the University of Cambridge for doctoral studies. She completed her Ph.D. in 1990; her dissertation, Destruction of tori in dissipative flows, was supervised by Nigel Weiss.

She was a postdoctoral researcher at the University of California, Berkeley and at the California Institute of Technology.

Books
Kirk is the co-author of the books Mathematical Analysis of Complex Cellular Activity (Springer, 2015) and Models of Calcium Signalling (Springer, 2016).

Recognition
In 2017, Kirk won the Miriam Dell Excellence in Science Mentoring Award of New Zealand's Association for Women in the Sciences, in part for her efforts in founding and running a series of annual workshops for young women in mathematics and physics since 2007.

References

Year of birth missing (living people)
Living people
New Zealand women mathematicians
Academic staff of the University of Auckland
21st-century New Zealand mathematicians